is a Japanese para-badminton player who competes in international elite competitions. She won a gold medal in Women's doubles WH1–WH2, and a bronze medal in Women's singles WH2, at the 2020 Summer Paralympics.

Life 
Yamazaki sustained a spinal cord injury when she was involved in a traffic accident at age 16.

Achievements

Paralympic Games 
Women's singles WH2

Women's doubles WH1–WH2

World Championships 
Women's singles

Women's doubles

Asian Para Games 
Women's singles

Mixed doubles

Asian Championships

BWF Para Badminton World Circuit (9 titles, 1 runners-up) 

Women's singles 

Women's doubles

References

Notes 

1988 births
Living people
People from Kokubunji, Tokyo
Sportspeople from Tokyo
Japanese female badminton players
Japanese para-badminton players
Paralympic badminton players of Japan
Badminton players at the 2020 Summer Paralympics
Medalists at the 2020 Summer Paralympics
Paralympic gold medalists for Japan
Paralympic bronze medalists for Japan
Paralympic medalists in badminton
People with paraplegia
21st-century Japanese women